Liebe macht Monster (German for "love makes monsters"), sometimes also spelled Liebe Macht Monster ("Love, Power, Monsters"), is the ninth studio album by German rock band Eisbrecher.

Track listing

Charts

Weekly charts

References

2021 albums
Eisbrecher albums
Metropolis Records albums
German-language albums